Montserrat is a surname. People with the surname include:

 Alba Montserrat (born 1984), Catalan football player
 Dolors Montserrat (born 1973), Spanish lawyer and politician
 Dominic Montserrat (1964–2004), British egyptologist and papyrologist
 Enrique Montserrat (born 1935), Spanish gymnast
 Jade Montserrat, British artist and writer 
 Joan Sella i Montserrat (born 1960), Catalan journalist
 Joaquín de Montserrat (1700–1771), Valencian viceroy of New Spain
 Josep Montserrat i Torrents (born 1932), Catalan historian
 María de Montserrat (1913–1995), Uruguayan writer
 Marti Montserrat Guillemat (1906–1990), Catalan musician
 Nil Montserrat (born 1988), Catalan racing driver
 Ricardo Montserrat (1954–2020), French author

Catalan-language surnames